The University of British Columbia (UBC) is a Canadian public research university with campuses in Vancouver and Kelowna, British Columbia. The following is a list of faculties and schools at UBC.

UBC Vancouver
Faculty of Applied Science 
 Engineering 
School of Biomedical Engineering 
Department of Chemical and Biological Engineering 
Clean Energy Engineering 
Department of Civil Engineering 
Department of Electrical Engineering and Computer Engineering 
Engineering Physics 
Environmental Engineering 
Geological Engineering 
Integrated Engineering 
Department of Materials Engineering
Department of Mechanical Engineering 
Keevil Institute of Mining Engineering
Manufacturing Engineering
 School of Architecture and Landscape Architecture
 School of Community and Regional Planning  
 School of Nursing
Faculty of Arts 
Department of Anthropology
Department of Art History, Visual Art and Theory  
Department of Asian Studies 
Department of Classical, Near Eastern and Religious Studies 
Department of Central Eastern Northern European Studies  
UBC Vancouver School of Economics 
Department of English 
Department of French, Hispanic & Italian Studies  
Department of Geography 
Department of History 
Humanities 101 (Downtown Eastside Community Program and Outreach)
School of Journalism 
School of Library, Archival and Information Studies  
Department of Linguistics 
Museum of Anthropology 
School of Music 
Department of Philosophy 
Department of Political Science 
Department of Psychology 
School of Social Work 
Department of Sociology
Department of Theatre and Film
Women's and Gender Studies Program 
Sauder School of Business 
Division of Accounting
Division of Finance
Division of Law
Division of Management Information Systems
Division of Marketing
Master of Business Administration 
Master of Management in Operations Research 
Division of Operations and Logistics
Division of Organizational Behaviour and Human Resources
PhD Program
Real Estate Division 
Division of Strategy and Business Economics
Continuing Studies 
Faculty of Dentistry 
Faculty of Education
Department of Educational and Counseling Psychology, and Special Education 
Centre for Cross-Faculty Inquiry in Education  
Department of Curriculum and Pedagogy
Department of Educational Studies 
UBC School of Kinesiology
Department of Language and Literacy Education 
Teacher Education
Faculty of  Forestry 
Department of  Forest Resources Management 
Department of Forest and Conservation Sciences 
Department of Wood Science 
Faculty of Graduate Studies 
Green College
St. John's College
Interdisciplinary Graduate Studies Program
College of Health Disciplines 
College for Interdisciplinary Studies 
Asia Pacific Policy Studies 
Bioinformatics
European Studies 
Genetics
Neuroscience
Environmental Health 
Oncology
Planning 
Resources, Management and Environmental Studies 
Software Systems 
Women's and Gender Studies Program 
Global Resource Systems 
Applied Biology (formerly Agroecology) 
Food, Nutrition & Health 
UBC Farm 
Dairy Education and Research Centre 
Graduate Studies 
Peter A. Allard School of Law 
Faculty of Medicine
Department of Anesthesiology, Pharmacology and Therapeutics
School of Audiology and Speech Sciences 
Department of Biochemistry and  Molecular Biology 
Department of Cellular  and Physiological Sciences  
Department of Dermatology and Skin Science  
Department of Family Practice 
Department of Medical Genetics 
Department of Medicine  
Department of Obstetrics and Gynaecology 
Department of Occupational Science & Occupational Therapy 
Department of Ophthalmology and Visual  Sciences  
Department of Orthopaedic Surgery 
Department of Pathology and  Laboratory Medicine 
Department of Pediatrics 
Department of Physical Therapy  
Department of Population and Public Health 
Department of Psychiatry 
Department of Radiology 
Department of Surgery  
Department of Urologic Sciences  
Division of  Continuing Professional Development 
Faculty of  Pharmaceutical Sciences  
Faculty of Science  
Department of Botany 
Department of Chemistry 
Department of Computer Science 
Department of Earth and Ocean Sciences  
Department of Mathematics 
Department of Microbiology and  Immunology 
Department of Physics and Astronomy 
Department of Statistics 
Department of Zoology

UBC Okanagan
Irving K. Barber Faculty of Arts and Social Sciences
Department of Community, Culture and Global Studies
Department of History and Sociology 
Department of Economics, Philosophy and Political Science
Department of Psychology 
Irving K. Barber Faculty of Science
Department of Biology
Department of Chemistry
Department of Computer Science, Mathematics, Physics and Statistics
Department of Earth & Environmental Sciences and Geographic Sciences
Faculty of Creative and Critical Studies  
Department of Creative Studies (Art History and Visual Culture, Creative Writing, Devised Theatre, Media Studies, Visual Arts)
Department of English and Cultural Studies
Department of Languages and World Literatures (French, German, Japanese, Spanish, World Literatures)
Okanagan School of Education
Education Technology Centre 
Faculty of Applied Science
School of Engineering
Civil Engineering
Electrical Engineering
Mechanical Engineering
Manufacturing Engineering
Faculty of Health and Social Development 
School of Nursing
School of Social Work
School of Health and Exercise Sciences 
Health  Studies
Human Kinetics
Faculty of Management   
Faculty of Medicine
Southern Medical Program  
College of Graduate Studies

Notes

References

External links
UBC Vancouver Faculties and Schools
UBC Vancouver Faculties
UBC Okanagan Faculties and Schools

University of British Columbia